Anita Smith may refer to:
 Anita Miller Smith, American impressionist and regionalist painter